Streptomyces werraensis is an alkaliphilic  bacterium species from the genus of Streptomyces. Streptomyces werraensis produces nonactin, erythromycin and werramycine.

See also 
 List of Streptomyces species

References

Further reading

External links
Type strain of Streptomyces werraensis at BacDive – the Bacterial Diversity Metadatabase

werraensis
Bacteria described in 1964